Adams Township, Iowa may refer to the following places:

 Adams Township, Dallas County, Iowa
 Adams Township, Delaware County, Iowa
 Adams Township, Keokuk County, Iowa
 Adams Township, Mahaska County, Iowa
 Adams Township, Wapello County, Iowa

See also

Adams Township (disambiguation)

Iowa township disambiguation pages